Leonard Sidney Woolf (– ) was a British political theorist, author, publisher, and civil servant. He was married to author Virginia Woolf. As a member of the Labour Party and the Fabian Society, Woolf was an avid publisher of his own work and his wife's novels. A writer himself, Woolf created nineteen individual works and wrote six autobiographies. Leonard and Virginia did not have any children.

Early life

Woolf was born in London in 1880 the third of ten children of Solomon Rees Sidney Woolf (known as Sidney Woolf), a barrister and Queen's Counsel, and Marie (née de Jongh). His family was Jewish. After his father died in 1892, Woolf was sent to board at Arlington House School near Brighton, Sussex. From 1894 to 1899, he attended St Paul's School, and in 1899 he won a classical scholarship to Trinity College, Cambridge, where he was elected to the Cambridge Apostles. Other contemporary members included Lytton Strachey, John Maynard Keynes, G. E. Moore, and E. M. Forster. Thoby Stephen (his future wife's brother) was friendly with the Apostles, though not a member himself. Woolf was awarded his BA in 1902, but stayed there for another year to study for the Civil Service examinations held then.

In October 1904, Woolf moved to Ceylon (now Sri Lanka) to become a cadet in the Ceylon Civil Service, in Jaffna and later Kandy, and by August 1908 was named an assistant government agent in the Southern Province, where he administered the District of Hambantota. Woolf returned to England in May 1911 for a year's leave. Instead, however, he resigned in early 1912 and that same year married Virginia Stephen.

Leonard and Virginia Woolf lived at 17 The Green Richmond starting from October 1914. In early March 1915, the couple moved to nearby Hogarth House, Paradise Road.

In 1919, the Woolfs purchased the Round House in Pipe Passage, Lewes. The same year, they discovered Monk's House in nearby Rodmell, which both she and Leonard favoured because of its orchard and garden. She then bought Monk's House and sold the Round House.

Together, Leonard and Virginia Woolf became influential in the Bloomsbury Group, which also included various other former Apostles.

In December 1917, Woolf became one of the co-founders of the 1917 Club, which met in Gerrard Street, Soho.

Writing
After marriage, Woolf turned to writing and published his first novel, The Village in the Jungle (1913), which is based on his years in Ceylon. A series of books followed at roughly bi-annual intervals.

On the introduction of conscription in 1916, during the First World War, Woolf was rejected for military service on medical grounds, and turned to politics and sociology. He joined the Labour Party and the Fabian Society, and became a regular contributor to the New Statesman. In 1916, he wrote International Government, proposing an international agency to enforce world peace.

As his wife's mental health worsened, Woolf devoted much of his time to caring for her (he himself suffered from depression). In 1917, the Woolfs bought a small hand-operated printing press and with it they founded the Hogarth Press. Their first project was a pamphlet, hand-printed and bound by themselves. Within ten years the Press had become a full-scale publishing house, issuing Virginia's novels, Leonard's tracts and, among other works, the first edition of T. S. Eliot's The Waste Land. Woolf continued as the main director of the Press until his death. His wife suffered from severe bouts of mental illness throughout her life, until her suicide by drowning in 1941. Later, Leonard fell in love with a married artist, Trekkie Parsons.

In 1919, Woolf became editor of the International Review. He also edited the international section of the Contemporary Review from 1920 to 1922. He was literary editor of The Nation and Athenaeum, generally referred to simply as The Nation, from 1923 to 1930), and joint founder and editor of The Political Quarterly from 1931 to 1959), and for a time he served as secretary of the Labour Party's advisory committees on international and colonial questions.

In 1960, Woolf revisited Ceylon and was surprised at the warmth of the welcome he received, and even the fact that he was still remembered. Woolf accepted an honorary doctorate from the then-new University of Sussex in 1964 and in 1965 he was elected a Fellow of the Royal Society of Literature. He declined the offer of Companion of Honour (CH) in the Queen's Birthday Honours list in 1966.

Family
Among his nine siblings, Bella Woolf was also an author.
His brother Cecil Nathan Sidney Woolf was the author of Poems (published 1918); Cecil was killed in World War I in 1917. His dissertation Bartolus of Sassoferrato, his Position in the History of Medieval Political Thought was expanded to a book published by Cambridge University Press in 1913 in collaboration with his brother Philip. Philip and Cecil also translated Stendhal's On Love (Duckworth, 1915).

Death
Woolf died on 14 August 1969 from a stroke. He was cremated and his ashes were buried alongside his wife's beneath an elm tree in his beloved garden at Monk's House, Rodmell, Sussex. The tree subsequently blew down and Woolf's remains have since been marked by a bronze bust.

His papers are held by the University of Sussex at the  Falmer campus.

Works
 The Village in the Jungle – 1913
 The Wise Virgins – 1914 (Republished in 2003 by Persephone Books)
 International Government – 1916
 The Future of Constantinople – 1917
 The Framework of a Lasting Peace - 1917
 Cooperation and the Future of Industry – 1918
 Economic Imperialism – 1920
 Empire and Commerce in Africa – 1920
 Socialism and Co-operation – 1921
 International co-operative trade – 1922
 Fear and Politics – 1925
 Essays on Literature, History, Politics – 1927
 Hunting the Highbrow – 1927
 Imperialism and Civilization – 1928
 After the Deluge (Principia Politica), 3 vols. – 1931, 1939, 1953
 Quack! Quack! – 1935
 Barbarians at the Gate – 1939
 The War for Peace – 1940
 A Calendar of Consolation – selected by Leonard Woolf, 1967

Autobiographical works
  Published in America as  Also .
  Also  (1977),  (1967), Eland (2015).
  Also 
 
 
  Published in America as

Biographical works on Woolf
De Silva, Prabhath: Leonard Woolf as a Judge in Ceylon: A British Civil Servant as a Judge in the Hambantota District of Colonial Sri Lanka (1908–1911). Neptune Publications (Pvt) Ltd, Battaramulla, Sri Lanka (2nd edition 2016). 

Edited excerpt of book available at 
 Review of book with details about Leonard Woolf available at

Related works and cultural references
 In 1982, a film version in Sinhala of Woolf's novel, Village in the Jungle, called Bæddegama was released. It featured Arthur C. Clarke in the role of Woolf.
 A film version of Michael Cunningham's 1998 Pulitzer Prize winning novel, The Hours, was released in 2002, starring Nicole Kidman as Virginia Woolf. The part of Leonard Woolf was played by Stephen Dillane.
 In 2005, a book titled Woolf in Ceylon was published by author Christopher Ondaatje. This is an unusual "in-the-footsteps of" book by the elder brother of novelist Michael Ondaatje.
 It is possibly that Leonard Wolf, Claudia's father in the video game Silent Hill 3 is named after Woolf.

See also
Trekkie Parsons

References

External links 

 
 
 
The Leonard Woolf fonds at the Victoria University Library at the University of Toronto consists of correspondence from Woolf to Ellen Alderm, 1935, and Mrs. Easdale, 1935, 1964–1968, primarily re submissions to Hogarth Press
 "Stories of the East by Leonard Woolf" via Discovering Literature at the British Library
 Frederic Spotts collection of papers on the letters of Leonard Woolf at the Mortimer Rare Book Collection, Smith College Special Collections

1880 births
1969 deaths
Bloomsbury Group
English Jews
English memoirists
Publishers (people) from London
Stephen-Bell family
British Jewish writers
People educated at St Paul's School, London
Alumni of Trinity College, Cambridge
Members of the Fabian Society
Jewish socialists
British civil servants in Ceylon
Sri Lankan Jews
Sri Lankan people of English descent
20th-century English novelists
Virginia Woolf
Jewish British politicians
Labour Party (UK) parliamentary candidates
20th-century English businesspeople